The 1990–91 South-West Indian Ocean cyclone season was fairly quiet, although activity began early and the final named storm formed at a record late date. There were seven named storms classified by the Météo-France office (MFR) on Réunion, as well as three depressions; an additional depression was classified by the Joint Typhoon Warning Center (JTWC), an unofficial warning agency. The JTWC tracked storms in both September and October, although neither affected land. In late November, another short-lived depression formed in the northeastern portion of the basin. Activity remained minimal until January, when Tropical Storm Alison formed in the eastern portion of the basin. It passed near the island of Rodrigues, becoming the worst cyclone there in 20 years and killing half of the population of one endangered species. Bella also likely caused a cargo ship to go missing with 36 people on board. Three storms developed in short succession in the second half of February. Cyclone Cynthia developed rapidly in the Mozambique Channel on February 16 and struck western Madagascar, killing 36 people and ruining local rice harvests. A residual trough after Cynthia dissipated spawned Tropical Storm Debra, which looped in the Mozambique Channel. Toward the end of the month, Tropical Storm Elma exited the basin into the adjacent Australian region, only to re-enter the south-west Indian Ocean and dissipate. Long-lived Cyclone Fatima originated in the Australian basin in late March and changed directions before becoming extratropical. On April 2, a tropical depression struck eastern Madagascar, killing 18 people. The final storm, Gritelle, was named on June 10, the latest on record.

Seasonal summary 

During the season, the Météo-France office (MFR) on Réunion island issued warnings in tropical cyclones within the basin. The agency estimated intensity through the Dvorak technique, and warned on tropical cyclones in the region from the coast of Africa to 90° E, south of the equator. Beginning in November 1990, MFR utilized a high resolution picture transmission station in conjunction with its satellite imagery. This allowed for improved Dvorak ratings, allowing for zooming and adjusting the satellite pictures. The Joint Typhoon Warning Center (JTWC), which is a joint United States Navy – United States Air Force task force, also issued tropical cyclone warnings for the southwestern Indian Ocean. In addition to the named storms, the MFR also tracked four tropical depressions, named A1, A2, A3, and G1.

In general, the monsoon was weaker than normal within the basin, which provided less flow across the equator to spawn tropical cyclones. As a result, there was a marked decrease in overall activity compared to the 1989–90 season. The MFR issued 198 cyclone bulletins during the season, a 40% decrease over the previous year. Many of the storms formed at the edge of satellite coverage.

Systems

Severe Tropical Storm Alison 

A southward-moving anticyclone influenced the monsoon trough to spawn a tropical disturbance on January 8, located east of Diego Garcia. The system moved to the east without much organization, turning to the southwest on January 11 around a ridge. On the next day, the JTWC classified the system as Tropical Cyclone 07S, the same day that the MFR upgraded the depression to Tropical Storm Alison. By that time, the storm had turned more to the south-southeast, and began to weaken on January 16. Two days later, Alison weakened to tropical depression status and dissipated.

Tropical Cyclone Bella 

Similar to Alison, Bella originated on January 18 from a surge in the monsoon trough to the southwest of Sumatra. For several days, the system remained weak as it moved generally west-southwestward. The storm turned to the south-southwest and back to the southeast again, becoming extratropical on February 4.

While passing near Rodrigues, Bella produced strong winds and high tides, the latter of which caused flooding in the capital Port Mathurin. The storm was considered the worst on the island in 20 years. About 1,500 homes were damaged or destroyed, leaving 1,000 people homeless. Bella also severely damaged crops, roads, and the power grid on Rodrigues. The storm killed about half of the Rodrigues flying fox, a critically endangered species. Elsewhere, Bella was believed to have sunk a Madagascar cargo ship, with its 36 people on board.

Tropical Cyclone Cynthia 

For several days beginning on February 9, an area of convection persisted in the Mozambique Channel off the southeast coast of Mozambique, between the towns of Beira and Quelimane. On February 15, deep convection increased greatly, leading to a tropical disturbance forming at 06:00 UTC the next morning. Also on February 16, the JTWC initiated advisories on Tropical Cyclone 10S. Moving southeastward, the convection quickly organized around the center, aided by warm sea surface temperatures and convergence. Late on February 16, the system intensified into Tropical Storm Cynthia while it was passing near Juan de Nova Island. Shortly thereafter, the storm made landfall on western Madagascar just north of Morondava. It rapidly weakened over land as it shifted to the south and later southwest. Early on February 19, Cynthia emerged into the Mozambique Channel as a tropical disturbance, and the circulation dissipated shortly thereafter.

The city also recorded  of rainfall. In some locations, the rainfall from Cynthia was heavier than the average annual precipitation. In some villages, the storm destroyed upwards of 98% of houses, leaving 125,000 people homeless nationwide. The cyclone also wrecked crops and killed livestock, with over 20,000 tons of rice destroyed that had been readied for harvest. Cynthia destroyed an irrigation canal in Morondava, flooding  of rice fields. Flooding washed away or heavily damaged several roads and bridges in southwestern Madagascar. The Morondava River, which empties into the Mozambique Channel at Morondava, eroded greatly during the storm. Cynthia killed 36 people, mostly in Toliara. Heavy rains from the storm also spread into Tanzania, causing flooding that destroyed 90 houses and washed away two bridges.

Following the storm, the Malagasy government appealed for international aid. In response, the United States Agency for International Development (USAID) provided $25,000 (USD) toward rebuilding damaged roofs and placing a temporary pontoon bridge where a bridge had been washed out. Due to the damaged rice harvest, the Food for Peace program via USAID provided 15,000 tons of rice to Madagascar at the cost of $7.5 million (USD). The French government bought 130 tons of rice seed to be distributed to affected farmers. Local governments in Madagascar provided 6,000 farmers with rice seed to replant the ruined crop. In addition, the Swiss government provided money toward a reforestation project to discourage slash-and-burn practices.

Severe Tropical Storm Debra 

After Cynthia dissipated, a residual trough persisted in the Mozambique Channel, spawning a tropical disturbance on February 22 about halfway between Madagascar and Mozambique. The interaction between cool air from the south and warm monsoonal air to the north fueled deep convection. After initially moving to the south, the system turned more to the southwest toward Mozambique on February 24, developing an eye feature in the center. The JTWC initiated advisories that day as Tropical Cyclone 12S, although the MFR initially maintained the system as a subtropical depression. That day, the storm approached the coast of Mozambique within  before turning to the east-northeast. While moving to the northeast, Debra passed within  of Europa Island on February 27. The storm subsequently executed a counterclockwise loop to the south, during which it began weakening. By February 28, Debra had weakened to minimal tropical storm status while accelerating to the southeast, although it briefly re-intensified the next day. On March 4, an approaching cold front absorbed the storm.

Severe Tropical Storm Elma 

On February 26, a tropical disturbance formed in the northeastern portion of the basin, well to the east-southeast of Diego Garcia. It originated from the monsoon trough, and moved generally to the south-southeast while quickly intensifying. Late on February 26, the MFR upgraded the depression to Tropical Storm Elma, around the same time the JTWC began tracking it as Tropical Cyclone 17S. Shortly thereafter, the storm crossed 90° E into the Australian region, where the Bureau of Meteorology estimated that Elma entered at tropical cyclone status. Steady weakening commenced due to the influence of a trough and cooler waters. Elma weakened to the equivalent of tropical depression status by March 3 before turning back to the west. On March 5, the system recrossed 90° E into the south-west Indian Ocean, dissipating shortly thereafter.

Tropical Cyclone Fatima 

A surge in the monsoon trough spawned what would become Cyclone Fatima to the southwest of Sumatra. On March 21, the MFR identified a tropical disturbance in the Australian region, which crossed into the south-west Indian Ocean on the next day. Also on March 22, the MFR upgraded the storm to Tropical Storm Fatima, and the JTWC tracked the system as Tropical Cyclone 17S. The storm moved southwestward due to a ridge to the northwest, and gradually intensified. The storm later turned more to the southeast, although it shifted back to the southwest on March 29. Fatima turned back to the southeast on March 31 and accelerated, weakening to tropical storm status due to upper-level wind shear. As it was approaching 90° E, Fatima became extratropical on April 1.

Tropical Depression G1 

Classified as Tropical Disturbance G1, the system initially moved to the west-northwest and had poorly-organized convection. On April 1, the disturbance turned back to the southeast and organized more due to an increase in convection. Later that day it turned back to the west toward Madagascar. It quickly weakened over land, dissipating on April 3.

The depression brought heavy rainfall to eastern Madagascar that resulted in flooding. The floods killed 18 people in the country.

Moderate Tropical Storm Gritelle 

On June 5, the near-equator trough spawned a tropical disturbance to the east-southeast of Diego Garcia. The system moved to the southwest and later to the west, influenced by a trough to the south. Initially it failed to intensify much, although an anticyclone provided favorable conditions for development, as did warm water temperatures. On June 7, the system passed south of the Chagos Archipelago, and on the next day the JTWC classified it as Tropical Cyclone 22S, the final of the season. On June 11, Gritelle began weakening due to increased wind shear, deteriorating to tropical depression status on June 12. Over the subsequent two days, the system executed a loop, maintaining its status as a tropical depression or disturbance. It accelerated to the southeast, dissipating on June 16.

The storm formed was very late in the cyclone season, making Gritelle the strongest June storm in 20 years, as well as the latest in the cyclone year that a storm was properly named. Tropical Depression Fely in 1983 formed later but was wrongly named, and Cyclone Odette in 1971 formed in July when the cyclone year ended on July 31. The end of the tropical cyclone year shifted from July 31 to June 30 in 2003.

Other storms 

On September 19, the JTWC began monitoring a system near the Chagos Archipelago. The system tracked westward, organizing enough that the JTWC classified it as Tropical Cyclone 01S on September 21.

Similar to the previous system, the JTWC began monitoring a disturbance on October 15. After an initial movement to the southwest, the system turned to the north and later to the west. Two days later, the agency declared the system as dissipated.

On November 29, the JTWC tracked a system to the east-southeast of Diego Garcia, which originated in the monsoon trough. The system moved to the southwest and was classified by MFR as Tropical Disturbance A2 on November 30. On December 2, the disturbance intensified into a tropical depression as it curved to the southeast. However, an increase in wind shear caused marked weakening. The JTWC discontinued advisories on December 4, although the MFR continued tracking the system until December 7, when the depression had curved back to the southwest for a final time.

Season effects 

|-
|  ||  || bgcolor=#| || bgcolor=#| || bgcolor=#| || None ||  ||  ||
|-
|  ||  || bgcolor=#| || bgcolor=#| || bgcolor=#| || None ||  ||  ||
|-
|  ||  || bgcolor=#| || bgcolor=#| || bgcolor=#| || None ||  ||  ||
|-
|  ||  || bgcolor=#| || bgcolor=#| || bgcolor=#| || None ||  ||  ||
|-
|  ||  || bgcolor=#| || bgcolor=#| || bgcolor=#| || Rodrigues ||  ||  || 
|-
|  ||  || bgcolor=#| || bgcolor=#| || bgcolor=#| || Madagascar, Juan de Nova Island ||  ||  || 
|-
|  ||  || bgcolor=#| || bgcolor=#| || bgcolor=#| || Mozambique, Europa Island ||  ||  ||
|-
|  ||  || bgcolor=#| || bgcolor=#| || bgcolor=#| || None ||  ||  ||
|-
|  ||  || bgcolor=#| || bgcolor=#| || bgcolor=#| || None ||  ||  ||
|-
|  ||  || bgcolor=#| || bgcolor=#| || bgcolor=#||| Madagascar ||  ||  || 
|-
|  ||  || bgcolor=#| || bgcolor=#| || bgcolor=#| || None ||  ||
|-

See also 

Tropical cyclones in 1990 and 1991
 Atlantic hurricane seasons: 1990, 1991
 Pacific hurricane seasons: 1990, 1991
 Pacific typhoon seasons: 1990, 1991
 North Indian Ocean cyclone seasons: 1990, 1991

References

External links 
 Cyclonic Phenomena In Indian Ocean watched by Meteosat (Season 1990-1991) archived at Webcite

 
South-West Indian Ocean cyclone seasons
Articles which contain graphical timelines